Hippo Island is a steep, rocky island,  long, which rises above the Shackleton Ice Shelf of Antarctica  north of Delay Point. It was discovered by the Western Base Party of the Australasian Antarctic Expedition under Mawson, 1911–14, who so named it because of its hippo-like shape.

See also 
 List of antarctic and sub-antarctic islands

References

Islands of Queen Mary Land